Hüseyin Göksenin Köksal (born 8 January 1991) is a Turkish professional basketball player for Galatasaray Nef of the Basketbol Süper Ligi (BSL). He is a 1.97 m (6'5¾") tall shooting guard.

Professional career

Galatasaray
Köksal began his pro career in 2010, with the Turkish club Galatasaray. With Galatasaray, he won the Turkish President's Cup (Turkish Supercup) in 2011, and the Turkish Super League championship of the 2012–13 season.

Darüşşafaka (loan)
He then moved to the Turkish club Darüşşafaka, on loan from Galatasaray, for the 2014–15 season.

Galatasaray (return)
He returned to Galatasaray for the 2015–16 season. With Galatasaray, he won the EuroCup 2015–16 season's championship. Köksal re-signed with the team on 10 August 2021.

Turkish national team
Köksal was a regular member of the junior national teams of Turkey. With Turkey's junior national teams, he played at the 2010 FIBA Europe Under-20 Championship and the 2011 FIBA Europe Under-20 Championship. He has also been a member of the senior men's Turkish national basketball team. With Turkey's senior team, he played at the EuroBasket 2015.

References

External links
Euroleague.net Profile
FIBA Archive Profile
Eurobasket.com Profile
TBLStat.net Profile

1991 births
Living people
Darüşşafaka Basketbol players
Galatasaray S.K. (men's basketball) players
Point guards
Shooting guards
Small forwards
Sportspeople from Trabzon
Turkish men's basketball players